Tynewydd, Tŷ Newydd (Welsh for 'new house') and other variations may refer to:

 Tynewydd, Ceredigion, a village near Y Ferwig
 Tynewydd, Rhondda Cynon Taf, a village near Treherbert
 Tŷ-Newydd, Ceredigion, a village near Llanrhystud
 Tŷ Newydd, a historic house in Llanystumdwy, Gwynedd, and home to the National Writing Centre of Wales
 Tŷ Newydd Burial Chamber, a Neolithic dolmen near Llanfaelog, Anglesey

See also
 Newhouse (disambiguation)
 Maisonneuve (disambiguation)
 Neuhaus (disambiguation)
 Casanova (disambiguation)